A is a collaborative studio album by American singer-songwriter Usher and American record producer Zaytoven, the latter of which entirely handling the albums production. It was released on October 12, 2018. The album is an homage to the city of Atlanta, where Usher and Zaytoven grew up. A features guest appearances from Future and Gunna.

Background and recording
On July 25, 2018, Mark Pitts, President of Urban Music at RCA, posted a photo on Instagram of him and Usher working in the studio. Pitts posted another image in September on his Instagram of him, Zaytoven, and Usher in the studio. Zaytoven and Usher previously collaborated on the 2009 single "Papers" from Usher's 2010 album Raymond v. Raymond.

In an interview Usher conducted the Thursday before the album release with The Fader, he said "Zaytoven and I were working on my project, my future album, actually. And we started working on songs, had great combinations between the first two, three, and we kept going."

The album was recorded at Westlake Recording Studios in West Hollywood, California.

Music and lyrics 
The album features songwriters Elliott Trent, Dimitri McDowell, and American gospel singer Deitrick Haddon. According to Pitchfork writer Briana Younger, "A is a solid homage to the duo's beloved Atlanta roots and the city's sound that has permeated just about every corner of popular music." Elias Leight of Rolling Stone wrote that "catching pop's waves has always been one of Usher's greatest strengths, whether that means collaborating with Lil Jon when crunk was going mainstream or charging into EDM".

Promotion
Usher announced the project on October 11, 2018 with a trailer showing himself and Zaytoven driving around Atlanta and visiting various locations. The trailer also featured various portions of the tracks; alongside this, Usher also posted snippets of the tracks separately on Instagram.

Artwork and packaging
The cover art for the album is designed by American fashion designer Virgil Abloh. The artwork is Abloh's album-themed take of his own signature Off-White branding.

Commercial performance
A debuted at number 31 on the US Billboard 200 with 15,000 album-equivalent units, which included 4,000 pure album sales.

Track listing

Personnel
Credits for A adapted from AllMusic.

Usher Raymond IV – vocals
Zaytoven – production
Future – vocals
Gunna – vocals

Charts

References

2018 albums
Usher (musician) albums
Albums produced by Zaytoven
Zaytoven albums
Collaborative albums